The Senegal National Under-17 Football Team, represents Senegal in international football at an under-17 level and is controlled by the Fédération Sénégalaise de Football. The team's first appearance on the continental stage was in 2011 at the 2011 African U-17 Championship. Senegal made their first appearance at the FIFA U-17 World Cup in 2019 in Brazil after Guinea was disqualified for fielding two overage players.

Competitive Record

Africa U-17 Cup of Nations
{| class="wikitable" style="text-align: center;font-size:90%;"
!colspan=9|Appearances: 2
|-
!Year
!Round
!Position
!Pld
!W
!D
!L
!GF
!GA
|-
|  1995
| rowspan="8" colspan="8" | Did Not Qualify
|-
|  1997
|-
|  1999
|-
|  2001
|-
|  2003
|-
|  2005
|-
|  2007
|-
|  2009

|-
|  2013
| rowspan="3" colspan="8" | Did Not Qualify
|-
|  2015
|-
|  2017

|-
|

FIFA U-16 and U-17 World Cup record

Current squad

See also
 Senegal national football team
 Senegal national under-20 football team

References

External links
Fédération Sénégalaise

17
African national under-17 association football teams